Brenda Shaffer (born c. 1965) is an American scholar who holds positions as Fellow with the Atlantic Council and professor at University of Haifa (on sabbatical). Shaffer was the former research director of the Caspian Studies Program at Harvard Kennedy School and past president of the Foreign Policy Section of the American Political Science Association. She specializes on energy in international relations and energy policy in the Caspian region and has written or edited several books of these topics, including "Energy Politics" and "Beyond the Resource Curse." Shaffer has also written a number of books on the topic of identity and culture in the Caucasus including explorations of Azeri literature and culture. She has been accused of lobbying for Azerbaijan and failing to disclose conflicts of interest.

Biography 
Shaffer was born in the United States in about 1965. She grew up in the San Francisco Bay area, attending Burlingame High School (California). In 1982, while still at high school, she made her first visit to the USSR. She received her Ph.D. from Tel Aviv University and a nonresident senior fellow with the Atlantic Council in Washington, D.C. She is on sabbatical from the University of Haifa, where she is a professor in the School of Political Science.

Previously, Shaffer taught at the department of Asian Studies and at the Graduate School of Management, division of natural resources management, at the University of Haifa. and was the research director of the Caspian Studies Project at Harvard Kennedy School, where she had been a postdoctoral fellow at the International Security Program. Shaffer has also held positions as president of the Foreign Policy Section of the American Political Science Association, researcher and policy analyst for the Government of Israel and visiting professor with the Azerbaijan Diplomatic Academy, and she provides energy industry research and consulting to businesses and governments.

Shaffer is the author or editor of a number of books and has given Congressional testimonies on several occasions in front of the United States House Committee on Foreign Affairs on issues related to U.S. policy in the Caspian region.

She has been referred to as a lobbyist on behalf of Azerbaijan, and has faced criticism over her writing of political articles and books related to Azerbaijan while hiding her commercial ties to the Azerbaijani government.

Short Bio
Currently nonresident senior Fellow at the Atlantic Council; on sabbatical from the University of Haifa.
2001-2004 Post-doctoral Fellow, "Young Truman Scholar" three-year fellowship in the field of Middle East Studies, Harry S. Truman Research Institute for the Advancement of Peace at the Hebrew University of Jerusalem (Israel).
2000-2001 Post-doctoral Fellow, International Relations & Middle East Studies, Hebrew University of Jerusalem (Israel).
1999-2005 Post-doctoral Fellow, International Security Program, Harvard Kennedy School, Harvard University (USA).
1996-1999 Ph.D. School of History, Tel Aviv University (Israel). Dissertation topic: "The Formation of Azerbaijani Collective Identity: in Light of the Islamic Revolution in Iran and the Soviet Breakup."
1986-1989 MA in Political Science (with specialization in Russian Studies) Hebrew University of Jerusalem (Israel). (MA thesis topic: "Soviet Power Projection— the View of the Military").
1983-1986 BA in Political Science and International Relations, Hebrew University of Jerusalem (Israel).

Publications

Books
Co-editor of Beyond the Resource Curse (University of Pennsylvania Press, 2012)
Author of Energy Politics (University of Pennsylvania Press, 2009)
Editor of The Limits of Culture: Islam and Foreign Policy (MIT Press, 2006)
Author of Partners in Need: The Strategic Relationship of Russia and Iran (the Washington Institute for Near East Policy).
Author of Borders and Brethren: Iran and the Challenge of Azerbaijani Identity (MIT Press, 2002). The book was also published in Turkish (Bilgi University Press, Istanbul, 2008) and in Persian (Ulus Press, Tehran, 2008).

Book chapters and other publications
"Energy Resources in the Eastern Mediterranean: Prospects for energy markets and regional developments" in Michael Leigh (ed.), Eastern Mediterranean Energy: Fuel for conflict or cooperation? (D.C.: German Marshall Fund, 2012).
"US Policy and the Strategic Caucasus" in Frances Burwell and Svante E. Cornell, eds., The Transatlantic Partnership and Relations with Russia (Washington: Atlantic Council of the United States and Institute for Security and Development Policy, 2012).
"Ethnic Politics in Iran," in  Reuven Pedatzur (editor), Iran and Regional Hegemony  (S. Daniel Abraham Strategic Dialogue Center in association with the Friedrich Ebert Stiftung, 2010).
"The Islamic Republic of Iran: Is It Really?" in Brenda Shaffer (ed.), The Limits of Culture: Islam and Foreign Policy (Cambridge, MA.: MIT Press, 2006).
"Iran’s Internal Azerbaijani Challenge: Implications for Policy in the Caucasus," in Moshe Gammer (ed.), The Caucasus (London: Frank Cass, 2004).
"U.S. Policy in the South Caucasus," in Dov Lynch (ed.) The South Caucasus: a challenge for the EU (Chaillot Paper 65, EU ISS, December 2003).
"Azerbaijan" in Waisman and Vasserman (ed.), Political Organizations in Central Asia and Azerbaijan: Sources and Documents (London: Frank Cass, 2003).
"Azerbaycan Cumhuryetinin Kurulusu: Iran’daki Azeriler Uzerinde Etkisi", in Emine Gursoy-Naskali and Erdal Sahin (eds.) Turk Cumhuriyetleri (Amsterdam/Istanbul, SOTA Publications, 2002)(in Turkish).
"Statement on The Caucasus and Caspian Region: Understanding U.S. Interests and Policy", Hearing Before the Subcommittee on Europe of the Committee on International Relations, House of Representatives, One Hundred Seventh Congress, First Session, October 10, 2001, Serial No. 107–51.
"U.S. Russian Relations: Implications for the Caspian Region", Belfer Center for Science and International Affairs, Harvard University, June 2001.
"Postscript" in David Menashri (ed.), Central Asia Meets the Middle East (London: Frank Cass, 1998).

Criticisms 
Shaffer's book, "Borders and Brethren: Iran and the Challenge of Azerbaijani Identity" received criticism from Touraj Atabaki, a professor of social history at the University of Amsterdam and a senior research fellow at the International Institute of Social History, who wrote that "Borders and Brethren is an excellent example of how a political agenda can dehistoricize and decontextualize history".

Shaffer's article "U.S. Policy toward the Caspian Region: Recommendations for the Bush Administration" has also created controversy with regards to the objectivity of Harvard's Caspian Studies Program. Ken Silverstein, of Harper's Magazine, in an article titled "Academics for Hire", wrote that "Harvard's Caspian Studies Program receives a lot of money from both the oil companies and from some of the governments... As I had previously reported, the Caspian Studies Program (CSP) was launched in 1999 with a $1 million grant from the United States‒Azerbaijan Chamber of Commerce (USACC) and a consortium of companies led by ExxonMobil and Chevron Corporation. The program's other funders include Amerada Hess Corporation, ConocoPhillips, Unocal, and Glencore International...

Shaffer has also drawn criticism for writing on geostrategic issues regarding Azerbaijan under her academic affiliations, while working as a consultant to the President of SOCAR, the State Oil Company of Azerbaijan. On September 17, 2014, The New York Times published an editor's note to highlight that Shaffer did not disclose her affiliation to SOCAR when publishing an Op-Ed in its pages about the conflict in Nagorno-Karabakh. This has drawn criticism in other notable news outlets.

In 2021, the Bulletin of the Atomic Scientists published an essay by Shaffer arguing that Armenia, with which Azerbaijan had just fought a war, should close its only nuclear power plant. The essay did not disclose Shaffer's financial interests. Discussing the incident, Eurasianet commented that "[t]o Caucasus watchers intrigued and depressed by the way Baku uses its oil wealth to buy praise and influence abroad, Shaffer is infamous."

References

Living people
Year of birth missing (living people)
American emigrants to Israel
American Jews
American political writers
Harvard Kennedy School faculty
Hebrew University of Jerusalem Faculty of Social Sciences alumni
Tel Aviv University alumni
Academic staff of the University of Haifa